The Innocents were an American pop group from Sun Valley, California, United States. The trio existed primarily between 1958 and 1964, although they did reform in the 1990s.

Career
The members of the group grew up in the same neighborhood and attended the same schools. They shared a love for harmony and music in general. They were discovered and signed to a contract with Andex Records by Herb Alpert, where they recorded under the name The Echoes.

After leaving Andex Records they changed their name and signed with Indigo Records as The Innocents. The trio were all members of a car club named The Innocents, hence the name of the group. Their first Indigo hit single, "Honest I Do," was released in 1960. It was produced by Gary Paxton. The record hit No. 28 on the Billboard Hot 100 in October 1960. "Honest I Do" was followed by “Gee Whiz” (a different composition than the popular Carla Thomas hit), which also topped out at No. 28 in January 1961. The 1961 album release, Innocently Yours, featured the trio staring out through prison bars. This cover is featured in the book, 1000 Album Covers. (Taschen)

At this time a new, young female singer named Kathy Young was signed to the Indigo label; the Innocents were asked to provide the background vocals for her recordings. The label used The Innocents' photos and name to gain publicity and thereby airplay for the Kathy Young singles. "A Thousand Stars" and others were released as by "Kathy Young with The Innocents." "A Thousand Stars" became a hit, reaching No. 3 on the Billboard Hot 100 in December 1960.

In June 1961, the British music magazine, NME, reported that the Innocents were part of Alan Freed's road show, that also included Brenda Lee, The Shirelles, Bobby Vee, Etta James, Gene McDaniels, The Ventures, Clarence "Frogman" Henry, The Fleetwoods, Kathy Young and Jerry Lee Lewis. The Innocents released seven singles after "Gee Whiz" on Trans World Records, Reprise, Decca, and Warner, but none of them charted, though they continued to score hits backing up Kathy Young.

The group disbanded in 1964. James West went on as a solo artist; Al Candelaria became a session musician. The group reunited in the 1990s for reunion shows.

Members
James West – First tenor, lead vocals
Darron Stankey – Second tenor
Al Candelaria – Baritone

References

External links
 
 Kathy Young and The Innocents
 The Innocents at electricearl.com
 Kathy Young at coloradio.com
 Kathy Young Official Website
 

Musical groups from Los Angeles
Musical groups established in 1958
Musical groups disestablished in 1964
1958 establishments in California